Kevin Hofland (born 7 June 1979) is a Dutch professional football manager and former player, and was last the head coach of Eerste Divisie club Willem II.

A centre back during his career, Hofland played 15 active seasons in which he amassed Eredivisie totals of 182 games and eight goals in 10 years, namely for PSV and Feyenoord. He also represented VfL Wolfsburg and AEK Larnaca in Germany and Cyprus, respectively.

Hofland became a Dutch international in the 2000s, earning 7 caps.

Club career

Fortuna
Hofland was born in Heerlen, but grew up in Brunssum, Limburg. He joined local SV Limburgia at the age of just four, moving to the professionals with Fortuna Sittard six years later. 

Hofland played in various positions during his youth career, mainly as a left midfielder or left back. In 1995, he was reconverted by manager Henk Duut into a central defender, where he remained for the rest of his career.

On 10 September 1997, Hofland made his Eredivisie debut with Fortuna, against Sparta Rotterdam (1–1 away draw). He finished his first season with only six league appearances, but subsequently became a starter, helping the side to the 12th-place in the 1999–00 campaign.

PSV
In summer 2000, Hofland signed with national giants PSV Eindhoven. Despite his young age and the heavy competition within the team, he quickly became an important player in the team's defence but, after a serious ankle injury in a 2002–03 UEFA Champions League group stage match against Arsenal, he lost his starting position to Wilfred Bouma. 

Hofland played 20 matches in 2003–04 to help the Philips outfit finished second in the domestic championship, to AFC Ajax. After the arrival of Alex on loan from Chelsea he decided to leave the club, having won a total of four major titles.

Wolfsburg
Former PSV manager Eric Gerets was one of the main reasons for Hofland to join VfL Wolfsburg in Germany. He went on to play three seasons in the Bundesliga, making his debut in the competition on 7 August 2004 in a 2–1 win at Borussia Dortmund (90 minutes played).

In his last two years with the Wölfen, Hofland played in 49 games combined scoring twice, but the team ranked 15th on both occasions, being the first side above the relegation zone.

Feyenoord / AEK
On 28 June 2007, Hofland signed with Feyenoord, for four years. He only managed to appear in eight league games in the 2009–10 season, winning the first and only Dutch Cup of his career in 2008.

In the 2010 offseason Hofland was loaned to Cypriot First Division club AEK Larnaca FC, helping the team to the fourth position in both the regular season and the second stage, whilst scoring a career-best five goals and being team captain.

Hofland signed a permanent deal with AEK in July 2011. On 17 March of the following year, however, he officially retired from professional football after another injury to his ankle.

International career
On 15 November 2000, Hofland played his first international match with Netherlands, starting in an away friendly with Spain in Sevilla (2–1 win). 

Four of his seven caps for the Oranje came during the ill-fated 2002 FIFA World Cup qualification campaign.

Managerial career
On 22 April 2020, it was announced that Hofland had signed a two-year contract as the new head coach of Fortuna Sittard, starting from the 2020–21 season. His predecessor Sjors Ultee became technical director from that moment on. He was dismissed by Fortuna on 11 November 2020, after the club only gained 3 points in its first 8 league games of the season.

On 2 June 2021, he was hired by VfL Wolfsburg in Germany, a club he also played for, as an assistant coach to Mark van Bommel.

On 14 March 2022, Willem II appointed Hofland as head coach on a deal until the end of the 2021–22 season, replacing Fred Grim. Despite the club suffering relegation at the end of the season, Hofland extended his contract until 2024. Hofland was fired in December 2022.

Career statistics

Club

International

Honours
Fortuna
KNVB Cup: Runner-up 1998–99

PSV
Eredivisie: 2000–01, 2002–03
Johan Cruijff Shield: 2000, 2001
KNVB Cup: Runner-up 2000–01

Feyenoord
KNVB Cup: 2007–08, runner-up: 2009–10

Personal life
Hofland is married. He and his wife have three sons and a daughter.

References

External links

Stats at Voetbal International 

1979 births
Living people
People from Heerlen
Dutch footballers
Association football defenders
Eredivisie players
Fortuna Sittard players
PSV Eindhoven players
Feyenoord players
Bundesliga players
VfL Wolfsburg players
Cypriot First Division players
AEK Larnaca FC players
Netherlands international footballers
Netherlands under-21 international footballers
Members of the People's Party for Freedom and Democracy
Dutch expatriate footballers
Expatriate footballers in Germany
Expatriate footballers in Cyprus
Dutch expatriate sportspeople in Germany
Dutch expatriate sportspeople in Cyprus
Fortuna Sittard managers
Willem II (football club) managers
Eredivisie managers
Eerste Divisie managers
Dutch football managers
Footballers from Limburg (Netherlands)